Timon kurdistanicus, the Kurdistan lizard, is a species of lizard in the family Lacertidae. It is found in north west Iran, north east Iraq, and south eastern Turkey.

References

Timon (genus)
Reptiles described in 1936
Taxa named by G.F. Suchow